A. B. Chapman may refer to:

 Arthur Barclay Chapman (1908–2004) a Wisconsin animal genetics researcher
 Alfred Beck Chapman (1829–1915),  California real-estate attorney and investor